The White Slave (Spanish: La esclava blanca), is a Colombian telenovela created by Eduardo Galdo and María Helena Porta for Caracol Televisión. The series originally aired from January 26, 2016 to April 25, 2016. The series stars Nerea Camacho as Victoria, Orián Suárez as Miguel and Miguel de Miguel as Nicolás.

Plot 
Victoria Quintero is born the daughter of Don Domingo Quintero, owner of the El Edén estate, and his wife Elena. Within weeks her parents die in a fire started deliberately by a neighboring landowner and merchant, Nicolás Parreño, who wants the Quintero land. Victoria is saved by her black nurse, Lorenza, and her husband, Tomás. With their daughters, Milagros and Rosita, Victoria is taken to a palenque deep in the jungle, where for twelve years she grows up as a maroon, believing this to be her family.

Victoria has a friend in the palenque, Miguel, the illegitimate son of Sara, a runaway slave, and Parreño. Together they visit the town of Santa Marta, but they are followed back to the palenque by soldiers who believe Victoria, a white girl, has been kidnapped. Parreño then hears about the supposedly kidnapped girl, guesses she is the missing Victoria, and orders his foreman to kill her. In a raid on the palenque, many of the maroons, including Lorenza, are killed, and the survivors are captured and returned to slavery. Tomás, his daughters, and Miguel all now become the slaves of Parreño.

Victoria escapes the attack and seeks refuge in the village church, whose priest, Father Octavio, sends her away to join a convent in Spain, where she is taught to read, write, and serve as a novice. Some ten years later, Victoria escapes from the convent, with the help of her best friend, Remedios. She then returns to Santa Marta posing as Lucía de Bracamonte, a Spanish aristocrat who has entered into an agreement to marry Parreño. Victoria’s plan is simply to find Miguel and his family and take them away, but in Santa Marta she is told the story of her parents’ death and decides to stay on and destroy Parreño.

Cast 
 Nerea Camacho as Victoria Quintero
 Orián Suárez as Miguel Nava Soler
 Miguel de Miguel as Nicolás Parreño, Main villain
 Modesto Lacen as Tomás
 Norma Martínez as Adela, Villain
 Ricardo Vesga as Enrique Morales, Villain
 Viña Machado as Eugenia Upton
 Andrés Suárez as Capitán Granados, Villain
 Natasha Klauss as Ana
 Miroslava Morales as Lorenza Aragón Yepes
 Ana Mosquera as Milagros
 Jose Luis Garcia Campos as Comandante Padilla
 Mauro Donetti as General Márquez
 Luciano D'Alessandro as Alonso Márquez
 Paola Moreno as Remedios
 Sara Pinzón as Victoria Quintero
 Carrel Lasso as Trinidad
 Cristina García as Isabelita Parreño
 Andrés Parra as Gabriel Márquez
 Teo Sierra as Alberto
 Jefferson Quiñones as Rubén
 Leonardo Acosta as Arturo López
 Juan Jiménez as Jaime López
 Karoll Márquez as Jesús Pimentel
 Mauricio Figueroa as Pedro Caicedo "Pardo"
 Nadia Rowinsky as Lupe
 Andrea Gómez as Catalina Restrepo
 Roberto Cano as Felipe Restrepo
 Camilo Sáenz as Joaquín Márquez
 Carlos Duplat as Abad Rangel
 Isabella García as Isabelita Parreño
 Sofía Jaramillo as Hilda
 Héctor de Malba as Martín King
 Luis Fernando Patiño as Soldado García

Episodes

Awards and nominations

References

External links 
 

2016 telenovelas
Colombian telenovelas
Caracol Televisión telenovelas
Spanish-language telenovelas
2016 Colombian television series debuts
2016 Colombian television series endings
Television shows set in Colombia